I'm Brain is the debut EP from Brain, an alter ego of American rapper Lil Dicky. Released on September 14, 2017 by Commission Records, the comedy EP features Lil Dicky himself and The Game.

Background and release
Brain first appeared on Lil Dicky's 2015 debut album Professional Rapper, featuring on the track "Pillow Talking". TJ Francis, in a piece for lifestyle website BroBible, wrote that the character allowed Lil Dicky to "dive deeper into his own mind and show off a different side". Mass Appeal published an interview with Brain on April 14, 2017, where he stated that he was working on a debut project. Lil Dicky teased a release from Brain on 1 September 2017, tweeting that "Brain been in the lab too" in response to a tweet asking about an upcoming album from Lil Dicky. 1 week later, Brain released a debut solo single on Soundcloud, entitled "Left Brain Right Brain". This was followed up the next day by another single featuring Lil Dicky called "Could I B Jesus". Hot New Hip Hop's Mitch Findlay praised the "banging instrumental" and Lil Dicky's "signature blend of hilarious wit and capable flow". While neither track was featured on the EP, the 7 track EP was released on September 14, 2017.

Critical reception
Aron A., writing a review for Hot New Hip Hop, deemed this EP "another confirmation of Lil Dicky's creative brilliance". In a self-published review on his theneedledrop YouTube channel, Anthony Fantano was more critical, calling it "unlikeable on all levels", but praising The Game's feature on "How Can U Sleep" and admiring the production and instrumentals. However, the review was broadly negative, with Fantano saying that "for something titled after a brain, it's pretty goddamn brainless".

In the Sonoma State Star, Nick Coats said of the EP that "if you are a fan of Dicky, you will appreciate his impressive flow, lyrical prowess and creative genius behind his character, Brain", presenting the opinion that while the EP is credited to Brain, the Brain persona "once again serves as comedic relief", and Lil Dicky takes the lead with what Coats calls "heavy lyricism and flows". XXL's Nick Mojica gave a similar view, writing that "although Brain is still used for comedic relief, Dicky once again flexes his lyrical prowess on the project".

Track listing
Credits adapted from Tidal.

References

2017 EPs
Hip hop EPs
Lil Dicky albums
Albums produced by Cubeatz
Comedy hip hop albums